Istaravshan District or Nohiya-i Istaravshan, formerly Uroteppa (or Ura-Tyube) District, is a former district in the central part of Sughd Region, Tajikistan, between the border with Uzbekistan to the west and Ghonchi district to the east. Its capital is Istaravshan (called Ura-Tyube until 2000). Around 2018, it was merged into the city of Istaravshan.

Administrative divisions
The district was divided administratively into jamoats. They were as follows (and population).

References

Former districts of Tajikistan
Sughd Region